This is a partial discography of Turandot, an opera by Giacomo Puccini. The first performance was held at the Teatro alla Scala in Milan on 25 April 1926, conducted by Arturo Toscanini.

Audio recordings

Video recordings

References

External links
Discog database of Turandot recordings

Opera discographies
Operas by Giacomo Puccini